Nishat Bagh is a terraced Mughal garden built on the eastern side of the Dal Lake, close to Srinagar in the union territory of Jammu and Kashmir, India. It is the second largest Mughal garden in the Kashmir Valley. Nishat Bagh, is also located on the bank of the Dal Lake. ‘Nishat Bagh’ is Urdu, and means the "Garden of Joy," "Garden of Gladness" and "Garden of Delight."

History

Located on the bank of the Dal Lake, with the Zabarwan Mountains as its backdrop, Nishat Bagh is a garden with views of the lake beneath the Pir Panjal mountain range. The Bagh was designed and built in 1633 by Asif Khan, elder brother of Nur Jahan.

An anecdote is told of the jealousy of the Emperor Shah Jahan on beholding such a delightful garden, which led to the abandonment of the garden for some time.

When Shah Jahan saw the garden, after its completion in 1633, he expressed great appreciation of its grandeur and beauty. He is believed to have expressed his delight three times to Asif Khan, his father-in-law, in the hope that he would make a gift of it to him. As no such offer was forthcoming from Asif Khan, however, Shah Jahan was piqued and ordered that the water supply to the garden should be cut off. The garden was then deserted for some time. Asif Khan was desolate and heartbroken; he was uninterested in the sequence of events. When he was resting under the shade of a tree, in one of the terraces, his servant was bold enough to turn on the water supply source from the Shalimar Bagh. When Asif Khan heard the sound of water and the fountains in action he was started and immediately ordered the disconnection of the water supply as he feared the worst reaction from the Emperor for this wanton act of disobedience. Fortunately for the servant and for the Khan, Shah Jahan, who had heard about this incident at the garden, was not disturbed or annoyed by the disobedience of his orders. Instead, he approved of the servant's loyal service to his master and then ordered the full restoration rights for the supply of water to the garden to Asif Khan, his Prime Minister and father-in-law.

The Mughal Princess Zuhra Begum, daughter of the Mughal Emperor Alamgir II and granddaughter of the Emperor Jahandar Shah, is buried in the garden.

Layout
Even though the layout of Nishat Bagh was based on the basic conceptual model of the Persian gardens, it had to be remodelled to fit the topographic and water source conditions at the site chosen in the Kashmir valley. The plan, instead of being central with four radiating arms in a square pattern as in the case of Chahar (suited for a flat countryside), was changed to an axial stream flow design to fit the hill condition with water source originating at the top of the hill end. This resulted in planning a rectangular layout rather than a square layout. This helped in dispensing with the long side arms.

Architecture
Nishat Bagh has a broad cascade of terraces lined with avenues of chinar and cypress trees, which starts from the lakeshore and reaches up to an artificial façade at the hill end. Rising from the edge of the Dal Lake, it has twelve 12 terraces representing twelve Zodiacal signs. However, it has only two sections, namely the public garden and the private garden for the Zanana or harem vis-à-vis the four sections of the Shalimar Bagh; this difference is attributed to the fact that the latter Bagh catered to the Mughal Emperor, while Nishad Bagh belonged to a man of his court, a noble. There are, however, some similarities with the Shalimar Bagh, such as the polished stone channel and terraces. The source of water supply to the two gardens is the same. Built in an east–west direction, the top terrace has the Zenana garden while the lowest terrace is connected to the Dal Lake. In recent years, the lowest terrace has merged with the approach road. A spring called the Gopi Thirst provides clear water supply to the gardens. There are a few old Mughal period buildings in the vicinity of the Bagh.

Water flows down in a cascade from the top to the first terrace at the road level, which could be also approached from the Dal Lake through a shikara ride. The water flow from one terrace to the next is overstepped stone ramps that provide the sparkle to the flow. At all the terraces fountains with pools are provided, along the water channel. At channel crossings, benches are provided.

The twelve terraces

The details of the twelve terraces have been recorded as originally built:
The first terrace is a water collection chamber that is also linked to the side flow from the garden.
The second terrace is accessed through a gate. This terrace has five fountains that is supplied water from the third terrace, from where it flowed to the lowest terrace.
The third terrace has a different design. The water chute has five arched open niches in the front and similar niches on the sides. A pavilion (baradari), a two-storied structure, which existed here when it was originally built, has since been dismantled. Stairways, on either side of the channel lead to the third terrace, which has a square chamber with five fountains. Moving up the flight of steps (four steps) on either side of the channel leads to the fourth terrace.
The fourth terrace has two levels namely, a water channel and a square pool. Stairways with 7 steps lead to the fifth terrace.
The fifth terrace, where a stone bench is provided to take in the view across the channel. This also has a square chamber with five fountains.
The sixth terrace is at two levels with five fountains and distinctive paving pattern.
The seventh terrace, where the same pattern continues.
The eighth terrace is only a water channel or chute.
The ninth terrace, at the end of two stairways, there is an octagonal bench. The pool in this terrace has nine fountains.
The stairways to the tenth terrace are along the side retaining walls where only the water chute with fountains is provided.
Engraved paths lead to an impressive eleventh terrace, which has twenty-five fountains in a pool. Up from this dramatic terrace is the last one.
Only one arch in this blind facade provides an opening to the twelfth terrace. Two small octagonal towers on either side of the retaining walls provide views of the lower level terraces. A two-storey pavilion here is surrounded by a lovely garden with lush plantings.

Out of all the terraces, the second terrace is considered the most impressive in view of the twenty-three niches provided in the arched recess just behind the cascade. Originally lighted lamps used to be placed at these niches. The second terrace also has an abundance of Persian lilacs and pansies coupled with sparkling cascading water over the chute, which provided a lovely sight.
Another interesting feature in the Nishat Bagh is of the many stones and marble thrones that are placed at the head of almost every waterfall.

Visitor information

The Airport connects to all major cities of India.
The National Highway NH1A connects the Kashmir valley with rest of the country. One way of visiting the Bagh is through the Dal Lake using the famous "water taxi" of Kashmir, the Shikara.

See also
 Foreshore Road
 Indo-Islamic Architecture
 Dal Lake
 Shalimar Bagh (Srinagar)
 Hazratbal

References

External links

The Herbert Offen Research Collection of the Phillips Library at the Peabody Essex Museum

Nishat Bagh on Archnet November 2019, active site

 Kashmiri Tourism, Dal Lake November 2019, active site

Mughal gardens in India
Mughal terraced gardens
Gardens in Jammu and Kashmir
Tourist attractions in Srinagar district
1663 establishments in the Mughal Empire